Pozba is a village and municipality in the Nové Zámky District in the Nitra Region of south-west Slovakia.

History
In historical records the village was first mentioned in 1245.

Geography
The municipality lies at an altitude of 156 metres and covers an area of 9.41 km². It has a population of about 565 people.

Ethnicity
The population is about 77% Hungarian, 22% Slovak and 1% Czech.

Facilities
The village has a small public library a swimming pool and a football pitch.

External links
http://www.statistics.sk/mosmis/eng/run.html
Pozba – Nové Zámky Okolie

Villages and municipalities in Nové Zámky District